William Pilch (4 November 1794 – 4 September 1866) was an English first-class cricketer who played for Norfolk from 1820 to 1836. He was the elder brother of Fuller Pilch. Pilch is recorded in eight matches, totalling 87 runs with a highest score of 30, holding 3 catches and taking 38 wickets with a best performance of 7 wickets in one innings.

He died at an inn in Sheffield, of 'mortification of the big toe'.

References

Bibliography
 

English cricketers
English cricketers of 1787 to 1825
English cricketers of 1826 to 1863
Norfolk cricketers
Players cricketers
1794 births
1866 deaths
People from Breckland District
Sportspeople from Norfolk